Ecsenius gravieri, the Red Sea mimic blenny, is a blenny from the Western Indian Ocean. It occasionally makes its way into the aquarium trade. It grows to a size of 8 cm in length. The specific name honours the French zoologist Charles Gravier (1865-1937), the collector of the type.

References

gravieri
Fish described in 1906